The Bronze Medal for Merit, post-nominal letters BMM, was instituted by the President of the Republic of South Africa in April 1996. It was awarded to veteran cadres of the Azanian People's Liberation Army, the military wing of the Pan Africanist Congress, for service of a high order during the "struggle".

Azanian People's Liberation Army
The Azanian People's Liberation Army (APLA) was the para-military wing of the Pan Africanist Congress (PAC). It was established in 1961 to wage an armed "struggle" against the Nationalist government inside South Africa. On 27 April 1994, the Azanian People's Liberation Army was amalgamated with six other military forces into the South African National Defence Force (SANDF).

Institution
The Bronze Medal for Merit, post-nominal letters BMM, was instituted by the President of South Africa in April 1996. It is the junior award of a set of three decorations for merit, along with the Gold Decoration for Merit and the Silver Medal for Merit.

The Azanian People's Liberation Army's military decorations and medals were modelled on those of the South African Defence Force. These three decorations are the approximate equivalents of, respectively, the Southern Cross Decoration and Pro Merito Decoration, the Southern Cross Medal (1975) and Pro Merito Medal (1975), and the Military Merit Medal.

Award criteria
The decoration could be awarded to veteran cadres of the Azanian People's Liberation Army who had rendered service of a high order during the "struggle".

Order of wear

The position of the Bronze Medal for Merit in the official military and national orders of precedence was revised upon the institution of a new set of honours on 27 April 2003, but it remained unchanged.

Azanian People's Liberation Army
  
Official APLA order of precedence:
 Preceded by the Silver Medal for Merit (SMM).
 Succeeded by the Operational Medal for Southern Africa.

South African National Defence Force until 26 April 2003
  
Official SANDF order of precedence:
 Preceded by the Transkei Defence Force Medal of the Republic of Transkei.
 Succeeded by the Merit Medal in Bronze (MMB) of Umkhonto we Sizwe.
Official national order of precedence:
 Preceded by the Transkei Defence Force Medal of the Republic of Transkei.
 Succeeded by the Merit Medal in Bronze (MMB) of Umkhonto we Sizwe.

Description
Obverse
The Bronze Medal for Merit was struck in bronze and has an engrailed edge which has nine points, to fit in a circle 38 millimetres in diameter. It depicts the Azanian People's Liberation Army emblem and a protea flower in each of the nine points.

Ribbon
The ribbon is 32 millimetres wide and dark blue, with two 6 millimetres wide dark yellow bands in the centre, spaced 4 millimetres apart.

Discontinuation
Conferment of the Bronze Medal for Merit was discontinued upon the institution of a new set of honours on 27 April 2003.

References

Military decorations and medals of Azanian People's Liberation Army
Awards established in 1996